In histology, a clear cell is a cell that shows a clear cytoplasm when stained with hematoxylin and eosin (H&E).

Normal histology
In the skin, some secretory cells in the epithelium appear as clear cells, and are one of the components of eccrine sweat glands. A clear cell's plasma membrane is highly folded, more so on the apical and lateral surfaces. The cytoplasm of clear cells contains large amounts of glycogen and many mitochondria. Melanocytes appear as clear cells when in the stratum basale of the skin, and Langerhans' cells appear as clear cells in the stratum spinosum.

C cells, more commonly referred to as parafollicular cells are type of cell found in the thyroid gland which stain clear using H&E.

Clear cell cancers
Clear-cell adenocarcinomas are adenocarcinomas that contain a preponderance of clear cells.

References

Tissues (biology)
Secretory cells